Echinoplectanum is a genus of monopisthocotylean monogeneans in the family Diplectanidae. All its species are parasites on the gills of fish; hosts recorded to date are all groupers (Family Serranidae), including coralgroupers (genus Plectropomus) and the Dusky grouper (Epinephelus marginatus). So far, species of Echinoplectanum have been recorded only from fish caught off Australia, New Caledonia and in the Mediterranean Sea.

The type-species of the genus is Echinoplectanum laeve Justine & Euzet, 2006.

Species
Species include:
Echinoplectanum chauvetorum Justine & Euzet, 2006 
Echinoplectanum echinophallus  (Euzet & Oliver, 1965) Justine & Euzet, 2006 
Echinoplectanum laeve Justine & Euzet, 2006 
Echinoplectanum leopardi Justine & Euzet, 2006 
Echinoplectanum plectropomi  (Young, 1969) Justine & Euzet, 2006 
Echinoplectanum pudicum Justine & Euzet, 2006 
Echinoplectanum rarum Justine & Euzet, 2006

References

External links

Monopisthocotylea
Platyhelminthes genera
Diplectanidae